Mitar Mrdić (born 7 February 1984 in Trebinje) is a Bosnian judoka.

Achievements

References

Bosnia and Herzegovina male judoka
1984 births
Living people
People from Trebinje
21st-century Bosnia and Herzegovina people
Serbs of Bosnia and Herzegovina